Coast to Coast is a 1980 American romantic comedy film starring Dyan Cannon and Robert Blake, directed by Joseph Sargent. The screenplay was written by Stanley Weiser. The original score was composed by Charles Bernstein. The film was shot in Stockton, California.  It was Blake's first film in six years and first since his popular TV series, Baretta left the airwaves.

Plot 

Madie Levrington is a wealthy woman who is also neurotic.  She was committed to a New York mental institution by her husband, Benjamin, in order to keep her from divorcing him and taking his money. She manages to escape and, in the process, hitches a ride on a livestock truck.

The truck is driven by Charles Callahan. Before realizing she is on his truck, he hears over his CB radio about her escape and a substantial reward for her return. This gets his attention as he is so in debt that he has a repo man after him to repossess his truck.

Behind her back, he meets up with people who are out to get Madie, and gets part of the reward money from the woman who leads them. At the same time, he is also slowly falling in love with her. He even teaches her to drive the truck (frantically, after he was hit in the crotch and sent flying by a bull).

Eventually she finds the money he was given and she wonders how he got it. He then reluctantly explains how, trying to explain that he took it unwillingly. She doesn't believe him and ends up getting in the truck and driving off without him.

He winds up hitching a ride on the back of a motorcycle with an older man. When they finally find the truck, he is forced to get off the bike and jump onto the back of the truck while both are still moving, thus putting him in her shoes at the beginning.

Madie drives the truck all the way back home to her husband, who is having a party in the backyard. Despite his pleas for her to stop the truck and that "everything will be just fine", in probably the most memorable scene in the film, she proceeds to wreak havoc on the party by running over everything in her way, and finally put the coup de grace on it by driving the truck through the house until it won't go any further.

After getting out of the truck, Benjamin tries to choke her to death, but Callahan jumps out of the trailer and tackles him to the canvas. Then she fingers him as the driver of the truck, and she and Callahan get away, but not before running one more time into the repo man, at which point he simply concedes the truck to him.

Cast 
 Dyan Cannon as Madie Levrington
 Robert Blake as Charles Callahan
 Quinn Redeker as Benjamin Levrington
 Michael Lerner as Dr. Frederick Froll
 Maxine Stuart as Sam Klinger
 William Lucking as Jules
 Rozelle Gayle as Orderly
 George P. Wilbur as Billy Ray
 Darwin Joston as Drunken Trucker
 Dick Durock as Gregory
 Cassandra Peterson as Dinner Party Guest
 Karen Montgomery as Dinner Party Guest
 Vicki Frederick as Golfer
 John Roselius as Policeman

Awards and nominations 
 1st Golden Raspberry Award
Nominated: Worst Actor (Robert Blake)

References

External links 
 
 
 

1980 films
1980 comedy-drama films
1980 romantic comedy films
Paramount Pictures films
1980s adventure films
1980s road movies
American road movies
Trucker films
Films directed by Joseph Sargent
Films scored by Charles Bernstein
American romantic comedy-drama films
1980s English-language films
1980s American films